Kazimierz Wielki University in Bydgoszcz (UKW), also known as the Casimir the Great University, is a state-funded university in Bydgoszcz, Poland. It was named after Casimir III the Great (Kazimierz III Wielki), the King of Poland (1333–70) who granted the city municipal rights on 19 April 1346.

History 
Kazimierz Wielki University is a public university founded in 1968. As the university expanded, its organization structure and name changed.

It began as the Teachers Training College (1969–74) with three faculties: Humanities, Mathematics & Natural Sciences, and Pedagogy. It became the Higher School of Pedagogy from 1974 to 2000 devoted to teacher training. Then it became the Kazimierz Wielki Academy of Bydgoszcz from 2000 to 2005, and it has been the Kazimierz Wielki University since 13 May 2005.

Faculties 
 Faculty of Humanities
 Faculty of Mathematics, Physics and Technical Sciences
 Faculty of Natural Sciences
 Faculty of Pedagogy and Psychology
 Faculty of Administration and Social Sciences
 Faculty of Physical Education, Health and Tourism

Staff and student numbers  
Casimir the Great University offers about 100 courses of study and specialties. In 2010 on university studied 14 000 students, of which about 33% were people from outside the region Kuyavian-Pomeranian. The university employed approximately 1,100 people, including 665 academic staff, 150 professors (including 60 titular).

University authorities 
 Rector Magnificus: Prof. Janusz Ostoja-Zagórski
 Vice-Rector for University Organisation and Development: Prof. Piotr Malinowski
 Vice-Rector for Research and International Relations: Prof. Sławomir Kaczmarek
 Vice-Rector for Education: Prof. Roman Leppert
 Administrative Director: Ewa Warczak, M.Sc.

Former rectors 
 Bolesław Ratusiow (23 March 1982 – 23 January 1984)
 Kazimierz Nowak (23 January 1984 - ?)
 Józef Banaszak (? - 31 August 1999)
 Michał de Tchorzewski (1 September 1999 – 31 August 2002)
 Adam Marcinkowski (1 September 2003 – 31 August 2006)
 Józef Kubik (since 1 September 2006)

See also 

 List of universities in Poland
 University of Technology and Life Sciences in Bydgoszcz
 Collegium Medicum in Bydgoszcz of the Nicolaus Copernicus University in Toruń
 Kujawsko-Pomorska Digital Library

References

External links 
 Official website (English version)
 Official students' forum
 University Accreditation Commission

 
Bydgoszcz
Buildings and structures in Bydgoszcz
Universities and colleges in Bydgoszcz